Democritus (Dēmókritos, meaning "chosen of the people";  – ) was an Ancient Greek pre-Socratic philosopher from Abdera, primarily remembered today for his formulation of an atomic theory of the universe. None of his work has survived.

Life
Although many anecdotes about Democritus' life survive, their authenticity cannot be verified and modern scholars doubt their accuracy. Democritus was said to be born in the city of Abdera in Thrace, an Ionian colony of Teos. Ancient accounts of his life have claimed that he lived to a very old age, with some writers claiming that he was over a hundred years old at the time of his death.

Philosophy and science
 states that the relation between Democritus and his predecessor Leucippus is not clear; while earlier ancient sources such as Aristotle and Theophrastus credit Leucippus with the invention of atomism and credit its doctrines to both philosophers, later sources only credit Democritus, making definitive identification of specific doctrines difficult.

Atomic hypothesis

The theory of Democritus held that everything is composed of "atoms," which are physically, but not geometrically, indivisible; that between atoms, there lies empty space; that atoms are indestructible, and have always been and always will be in motion; that there is an infinite number of atoms and of kinds of atoms, which differ in shape and size. Of the mass of atoms, Democritus said, "The more any indivisible exceeds, the heavier it is." However, his exact position on atomic weight is disputed. His exact contributions are difficult to disentangle from those of his mentor Leucippus, as they are often mentioned together in texts. Their speculation on atoms, taken from Leucippus, bears a passing and partial resemblance to the 19th-century understanding of atomic structure that has led some to regard Democritus as more of a scientist than other Greek philosophers; however, their ideas rested on very different bases.

Democritus, along with Leucippus and Epicurus, proposed the earliest views on the shapes and connectivity of atoms. They reasoned that the solidness of the material corresponded to the shape of the atoms involved. Using analogies from humans' sense experiences, he gave a picture or an image of an atom that distinguished them from each other by their shape, their size, and the arrangement of their parts. Moreover, connections were explained by material links in which single atoms were supplied with attachments: some with hooks and eyes, others with balls and sockets.

The Democritean atom is an inert solid (merely excluding other bodies from its volume) that interacts with other atoms mechanically. In contrast, modern, quantum-mechanical atoms interact via electric and magnetic force fields and are far from inert.

The theory of the atomists appears to be more nearly aligned with that of modern science than any other theory of antiquity. However, the similarity with modern concepts of science can be confusing when trying to understand where the hypothesis came from. Classical atomists could not have had an empirical basis for modern concepts of atoms and molecules.

The atomistic void hypothesis was a response to the paradoxes of Parmenides and Zeno, the founders of metaphysical logic, who put forth difficult-to-answer arguments in favor of the idea that there can be no movement. They held that any movement would require a void—which is nothing—but a nothing cannot exist. The Parmenidean position was "You say there is a void; therefore the void is not nothing; therefore there is not the void." The position of Parmenides appeared validated by the observation that where there seems to be nothing there is air, and indeed even where there is not matter there is something, for instance light waves.

The atomists agreed that motion required a void, but simply ignored the argument of Parmenides on the grounds that motion was an observable fact. Therefore, they asserted, there must be a void. This idea survived in a refined version as Newton's theory of absolute space, which met the logical requirements of attributing reality to not-being. Einstein's theory of relativity provided a new answer to Parmenides and Zeno, with the insight that space by itself is relative and cannot be separated from time as part of a generally curved space-time manifold. Consequently, Newton's refinement is now considered superfluous.

Democritus held that originally the universe was composed of nothing but tiny atoms churning in chaos, until they collided together to form larger units—including the earth and everything on it. He surmised that there are many worlds, some growing, some decaying; some with no sun or moon, some with several. He held that every world has a beginning and an end and that a world could be destroyed by collision with another world.

Ethics and politics
The ethics and politics of Democritus come to us mostly in the form of maxims. As such, the Stanford Encyclopedia of Philosophy has gone as far as to say that: "despite the large number of ethical sayings, it is difficult to construct a coherent account of Democritus's ethical views," noting that there is a "difficulty of deciding which fragments are genuinely Democritean."

Mathematics 

Democritus was also a pioneer of mathematics and geometry in particular. According to Archimedes, Democritus was among the first to observe that a cone and pyramid with the same base area and height has one-third the volume of a cylinder or prism respectively, a result which Archimedes states was later proved by Eudoxus of Cnidus. Plutarch also reports that Democritus worked on a problem involving the cross-section of a cone that Thomas Heath suggests may be an early version of infinitesimal calculus.

Anthropology
Democritus thought that the first humans lived an anarchic and animal sort of life, going out to forage individually and living off the most palatable herbs and the fruit which grew wild on the trees. They were driven together into societies for fear of wild animals, he said. He believed that these early people had no language, but that they gradually began to articulate their expressions, establishing symbols for every sort of object, and in this manner came to understand each other. He says that the earliest men lived laboriously, having none of the utilities of life; clothing, houses, fire, domestication, and farming were unknown to them. Democritus presents the early period of mankind as one of learning by trial and error, and says that each step slowly led to more discoveries; they took refuge in the caves in winter, stored fruits that could be preserved, and through reason and keenness of mind came to build upon each new idea.

Aesthetics
Later Greek historians consider Democritus to have established aesthetics as a subject of investigation and study, as he wrote theoretically on poetry and fine art long before authors such as Aristotle. Specifically, Thrasyllus identified six works in the philosopher's oeuvre which had belonged to aesthetics as a discipline, but only fragments of the relevant works are extant; hence of all Democritus's writings on these matters, only a small percentage of his thoughts and ideas can be known.

Works
Diogenes Laertius attributes several works to Democritus, but none of them have survived in a complete form.

 Ethics Pythagoras, On the Disposition of the Wise Man, On the Things in Hades, Tritogenia,On Manliness or On Virtue, The Horn of Amaltheia, On Contentment, Ethical Commentaries
 Natural science The Great World-System , Cosmography,On the Planets, On Nature, On the Nature of Man or On Flesh (two books), On the Mind, On the Senses,On Flavours, On Colours,On Different Shapes, On Changing Shape, Buttresses, On Images, On Logic (three books)
 Nature Heavenly Causes, Atmospheric Causes,Terrestrial Causes, Causes Concerned with Fire and Things in Fire, Causes Concerned with Sounds, Causes Concerned with Seeds and Plants and Fruits, Causes Concerned with Animals (three books), Miscellaneous Causes, On Magnets
 Mathematics On Different Angles or On contact of Circles and Spheres, On Geometry, Geometry, Numbers, On Irrational Lines and Solids (two books), Planispheres, On the Great Year or Astronomy (a calendar) Contest of the Waterclock, Description of the Heavens, Geography, Description of the Poles, Description of Rays of Light,
 Literature On the Rhythms and Harmony, On Poetry, On the Beauty of Verses, On Euphonious and Harsh-sounding Letters, On Homer, On Song, On Verbs, Names
 Technical works Prognosis,On Diet, Medical Judgment, Causes Concerning Appropriate and Inappropriate Occasions, On Farming, On Painting, Tactics, Fighting in Armor
 Commentaries On the Sacred Writings of Babylon, On Those in Meroe, Circumnavigation of the Ocean, On History, Chaldaean Account, Phrygian Account, On Fever and Coughing Sicknesses, Legal Causes, Problems

A collections of sayings credited to Democritus have been preserved by Stobaeus, as well as a collection of sayings ascribed to "Democrates" which some scholars including Diels and Kranz have also ascribed to Democritus.

Legacy
Diogenes Laertius claims that Plato disliked Democritus so much that he wished to have all of his books burned. He was nevertheless well known to his fellow northern-born philosopher Aristotle, and was the teacher of Protagoras.

See also
 Atom
 John Dalton
 Democritus University of Thrace
 Kanada
 Mochus
 National Centre of Scientific Research "DEMOKRITOS"
 Pseudo-Democritus
 Vaisheshika

Notes

Citations

References

Ancient testimony 
 Diodorus Siculus (1st century BC). Bibliotheca historica.
 
 Petronius (late 1st century AD). Satyricon. Trans. William Arrowsmith. New York: A Meridian Book, 1987.
 Sextus Empiricus. Adversus Mathematicos.

Translations 
 Bakalis, Nikolaos (2005). Handbook of Greek Philosophy: From Thales to the Stoics: Analysis and Fragments, Trafford Publishing, .
 Freeman, Kathleen (2008). Ancilla to the Pre-Socratic Philosophers: A Complete Translation of the Fragments in Diels, Forgotten Books, .

Sources

Further reading
 Bailey, C. (1928). The Greek Atomists and Epicurus. Oxford.
 Barnes, Jonathan (1982). The Presocratic Philosophers, Routledge Revised Edition.
 
 
 Guthrie, W. K. (1979) A History of Greek Philosophy – The Presocratic tradition from Parmenides to Democritus, Cambridge University Press.
 Kirk, G. S., J. E. Raven and M. Schofield (1983). The Presocratic Philosophers, Cambridge University Press, 2nd edition.

External links

 
 
 
 

5th-century BC philosophers
4th-century BC Greek people
4th-century BC writers
Abderites
Ancient Greek atomist philosophers
Ancient Greek epistemologists
Ancient Greek mathematicians
Ancient Greek metaphysicians
Metic philosophers in Classical Athens
Presocratic philosophers
460s BC births
370s BC deaths
5th-century BC mathematicians
4th-century BC mathematicians